Figueira may refer to:

Places

Brazil
 Figueira, Paraná

Cape Verde
 Figueira Pavão, Fogo Island
 Figueira (Maio), Maio Island
 Figueira da Naus, Santiago Island

Portugal
 Figueira da Foz, a city and municipality in the district of Coimbra
 Figueira de Castelo Rodrigo, a municipality in the district of Guarda
 Figueira (Faro), a village in the municipality of Faro
 Figueira, a civil parish in the municipality of Lamego
 Figueira, a civil parish in the municipality of Penafiel
 Figueira (Proença a Nova), a village in the civil parish of Sobreira Formosa

People
 Daniel Figueira (born 1998), a Portuguese footballer
 Edmar Figueira (born 1984), a Brazilian footballer
 Gilberto Figueira, nicknamed Uaué, (born 1988), an Angolan handball player
 Guilhem Figueira, Languedocian jongleur and troubadour of XIII century
 José Figueira, (born 1982), an English-Spanish football manager
 Manuel Figueira (born 1938), a Cape Verdean artist
 Maria Luisa Figueira (born 1944), a Portuguese psychiatrist
 Maria Tomásia Figueira Lima (1826-1902), Brazilian aristocrat, abolitionist
 Nayara Figueira (born 9 June 1988), a Brazilian synchronized swimmer.
 Roberto Horcades Figueira (born 1947), a Brazilian cardiologist
 Tchalé Figueira (born 1953), a Cape Verdean artist
 Tony Figueira (footballer) (born 1981 as José Antonio Pestana Figueira), a Venezuela-born Portuguese footballer
 Tony Figueira (photographer) (1959–2017), a Namibian photographer
 Walter Figueira (born 1995), English footballer

Other uses
 Fig tree, the literal translation of Portuguese "figueira".

See also

Portuguese-language surnames